The 70th Writers Guild of America Awards honored the best in film, television, radio and video-game writing of 2017. Winners were announced on February 11, 2018 at the Beverly Hilton Hotel, Beverly Hills, California and the Edison Ballroom, New York City, New York. The nominations for Television, New Media, Radio, News and Promotional Writing were announced on December 7, 2017, the Theatrical and Documentary Screenplay nominees were announced on January 4, 2018, and the Videogame Writing nominees were announced on January 11, 2018.

The West Coast show was hosted by Patton Oswalt and the East Coast show was hosted by Amber Ruffin.

Nominees

Film

Television

Documentary

News

Radio

Promotional Writing

Videogaming Writing

References

External links
 Official Site

2017
2017 film awards
2017 in American cinema
2017 in American television
2017 television awards
2017 guild awards
2017 awards in the United States
February 2018 events in the United States